The women's team tennis event was part of the tennis programme and took place between October 2 and 5, at the Khalifa International Tennis and Squash Complex.

Chinese Taipei won the gold after beating the Indian women's team in the final, India finished second, Japan and Uzbekistan won bronze medals.

The first seed China lost to Uzbekistan in the first round.

Schedule
All times are Arabia Standard Time (UTC+03:00)

Results

Round of 16

Quarterfinals

Semifinals

Final

Non-participating athletes

References

External links 
Official Website

Tennis at the 2006 Asian Games